Tympaki Airport is a military airport in Tympaki, Crete, Greece. It has also been used for car racing but it belongs to the Hellenic Air Force.The 138 Σ.Μ of H.A.F. operates at the airport. The airport also has a TACAN system for the aircraft. The airport used to have another runway (16/34) but now it's closed. Also home base airport of  H.A.T. (Heraklion Airclub Talos) for Gliders KA-7, KA-8 and Ultralight Tucano flights.

See also
List of airports in Crete

References

External links
Airports-Worldwide profile
Pilotinfo profile
World Aero Data:LG54
Airliners.gr Tympaki

Airports in Greece
Buildings and structures in Heraklion (regional unit)
Hellenic Air Force bases
Airports in Crete